Paralaea is a genus of moths in the family Geometridae described by Edward Guest in 1887. All the species live in Australia.

Species
Paralaea ochrosoma (Felder & Rogenhofer, 1875)
Paralaea beggaria (Guenée, 1857)
Paralaea porphyrinaria (Guenée, 1857)
Paralaea polysticha (Goldfinch, 1944)

References

Geometridae